Sarfaryab District is a district (bakhsh) in Charam County, Kohgiluyeh and Boyer-Ahmad Province, Iran. At the 2006 census, its population was 11,249, in 2,331 families.  The District has one city Sarfaryab. The District has two rural districts (dehestan): Poshteh-ye Zilayi Rural District and Sarfaryab Rural District.

References 

Districts of Kohgiluyeh and Boyer-Ahmad Province
Charam County